Congregation Beth Ora (House of Light) is a synagogue serving the Orthodox Ashkenazi Jewish community in Saint-Laurent, Quebec, Canada.

Founded in 1953 by William Weiss as "The Jewish Congregation of Saint Laurent", the synagogue adopted its constitution in 1956, and construction was finalized  in 1957.  The name was later changed to Beth Ora in 1959.

The synagogue is a member of the Orthodox Union.

External links 
 Beth Ora Official Website

References

Ashkenazi Jewish culture in Quebec
Ashkenazi synagogues
Jewish organizations established in 1953
Synagogues in Montreal
Orthodox synagogues in Canada
Saint-Laurent, Quebec